The Mahindra Verito Vibe is a subcompact notchback car made for the Indian market. It was developed as a variation of the Dacia Logan and introduced as a subcompact notchback for the Indian market in order to offer a hatchback-like car in a smaller size.

History
The Mahindra Verito Vibe was launched in 2013 to get the tax benefits offered to cars with a length below 4 meters. The car was a converted Mahindra Verito sedan (based on first generation of the Logan) into a sub 4-meter notchback.

References

External links
Official Mahindra Verito Vibe website

Verito Vibe
Cars introduced in 2013
Hatchbacks